The 2014 San Diego Toreros football team represented the University of San Diego during the 2014 NCAA Division I FCS football season. They were led by second-year head coach Dale Lindsey and played their home games at Torero Stadium. They were a member of the Pioneer Football League. They finished the season 9–3, 7–1 in PFL play to be crowned PFL champions. Due to Jacksonville's forfeit of the league season after disclosing financial irregularities (similar to San Diego's 2013 forfeit), they were designated the league's sole champion and earned the PFL's automatic bid to the FCS Playoffs, where they lost in the first round to Montana.

Schedule

References

San Diego
San Diego Toreros football seasons
Pioneer Football League champion seasons
San Diego
San Diego Toreros football